Transient neonatal pustular melanosis (TNPM), also known as pustular melanosis, is a transient rash common in newborns. It is vesiculopustular and made up of 1–3 mm fluid-filled lesions that rupture, leaving behind a collarette of scale and a brown macule.[3] This rash occurs only in the newborn stage, usually appearing a few days after birth[2], but is sometimes already present at birth[3]. The rash usually fades over three to four weeks  but may linger for up to three months after birth.[3] It can occur anywhere on the body, including the palms and soles.[1][2][3]

The cause of TNPM is unknown. No treatment is needed except for parental reassurance.

Causes

The cause of TNPM is unknown but it is a common rash in newborns.[3]

Histopathology

Gram, Wright, or Giemsa staining of the pustular contents will show polymorphic neutrophils and occasional eosinophils.[2][3] On histopathology, the pigmented macules will show basal and supra-basal increase in pigmentation without any pigmentary incontinence.[3] Bacterial culture will be negative.[4]

It has been suggested that TNPM is merely a precocious form of erythema toxicum neonatorum based on the similar histopathology.[4]

Diagnosis

Transient neonatal pustular melanosis is diagnosed clinically, based on appearance alone, with no need for special testing.  Proper identification is important to distinguish it from other serious, infectious neonatal diseases[3] and to help avoid unnecessary diagnostic testing and treatments.

Treatment

No treatment is needed except for parental reassurance.  The rash spontaneously resolves, usually in three to four weeks,  but may linger for up to three months after birth.[3]

Epidemiology

Transient neonatal pustular melanosis occurs in as much as 15% of black newborns.[3] but in less than 1% of white newborns. [2]

See also 
 List of cutaneous conditions

References 

1.    O'Connor NR, McLaughlin, MR, Ham P (2008). "Newborn Skin: Part I. Common Newborn Rashes". American Family Physician. 77 (1): 47–52.

2.    Patrizi A, Neri I, Virid A, Gurioli C.(2016). "Frequent newborn skin diseases". Clinical Dermatology. 4 (3-4): 82–86. doi: 10.11138/cderm/2016.4.3.082.

3.    Ghosh S. (2015). "Neonatal Pustular Dermatosis: An Overview". Indian Journal of Dermatology. 60 (2): 211. doi: 10.4103/0019-5154.152558

4.    Ferrándiz C, Coroleu W, Ribera M, Lorenzo JC, Natal A (1992). "Sterile transient neonatal pustulosis is a precocious form of erythema toxicum neonatorum". Dermatology. 185:18–22.

5.    Mebazaa A, Khaddar-Kort R, Cherif M, Mokni S, Haouet A, Osman B (2011). "Transient pustular eruption in neonates". Archives de Pediatrie. 18 (3) 291–293.

Disturbances of human pigmentation